The .360 Buckhammer (9×45 mm), also called 360 BHMR, is a SAAMI-standardized straight-walled intermediate rifle cartridge developed by Remington Arms Company. The cartridge was designed for use in American states that have specific regulations for deer hunting with straight-walled centerfire cartridges.

History 
At the 2023 SHOT Show in Las Vegas, Nevada, the .360 Buckhammer cartridge was introduced by Remington Arms. The Sporting Arms and Ammunition Manufacturers' Institute (SAAMI), the U.S. firearms and ammunition industry's technical standards-setting organization, announced the acceptance of the new cartridge and chamber standard on January 15, 2023.

Design 
The cartridge offers a flatter trajectory and better terminal performance over current straight-wall cartridges while remaining compliant in most applicable states.

.360 Buckhammer's parent case is the 30-30 Winchester, necked-up to use the same .358-caliber bullets as the .35 Remington and .35 Whelen.

Technical Drawing

State legislation 
.360 Buckhammer also addresses a rapidly growing market segment known as "straight-wall-cartridge-compliant" deer-hunting states. A growing number of states that previously restricted deer hunting to limited-range slug guns or muzzle-loading firearms are now allowing rifles chambered in straight-walled centerfire cartridges.

See also 

 List of rifle cartridges
 30-30 Winchester
 .350 Legend
 .35 Remington
 .35 Whelen
 .375 Winchester

References

External links 

Remington Arms cartridges
Pistol and rifle cartridges